John Patrick Daly (born April 28, 1966) is an American professional golfer on the PGA Tour and PGA Tour Champions. Daly is known primarily for his driving distance off the tee (earning him the nickname "Long John"), his non-country-club appearance and attitude, his exceptionally long backswing, the inconsistency of his play (with some exceptional performances and some controversial incidents), and his personal life. His two greatest on-course accomplishments are his "zero-to-hero" victory in the 1991 PGA Championship, and his playoff victory over Costantino Rocca in the 1995 Open Championship.

In addition to his wins on U.S. soil, Daly has won accredited pro events in South Africa, Swaziland, Scotland, Germany, South Korea, Turkey, and Canada.

According to official performance statistics kept since 1980, Daly in 1997 became the first PGA Tour player to average more than 300 yards per drive over a full season. He did so again in every year from 1999 to 2008, and he was the only player to do so until 2003. Daly also led the PGA Tour in driving distance 11 times from 1991 to 2002 with the exception of 1994 when Davis Love III took his spot.

Daly's last PGA Tour victory came in San Diego in 2004, earning him a two-year playing exemption. After 2006, Daly's career began to falter and he had trouble making cuts and staying on the tour. He was primarily earning PGA Tour event entries through past champion status and numerous sponsor invitations. Since 2016, Daly has competed on the PGA Tour Champions circuit, winning the 2017 Insperity Invitational.

Daly is the only man from either Europe or the United States to win two major golf championships but not be selected for the Ryder Cup since that event began in 1927.

Daly has been successful in multiple businesses. He is endorsed by LoudMouth Golf Apparel and owns a golf course design company. In addition, Daly has written and recorded music, and has released two music albums.

Early life, family, education, and early golf
Daly was born in Carmichael, California, on April 28, 1966. His father is Jim Daly, a construction worker for industrial plants; his mother is Lou Daly, a homemaker. The Daly family, solidly middle-class, moved very frequently during Daly's formative years, living in small towns across the southern states. His father frequently worked night shifts, and often had to commute significant distances between work and home.

With his father, mother, older sister and older brother Jamie, John moved from California to Dardanelle, Arkansas, when he was four years old. John began playing golf the following year, at the Bay Ridge Boat and Golf Club there. From his start in golf, Daly admired Jack Nicklaus, the dominant professional player of the time. When John was ten, his family moved to Locust Grove, Orange County, Virginia. John played golf there at the Lake of the Woods Golf Course in Locust Grove, where he won the spring club championship at age 13, defeating all the male members; the club promptly changed its rules barring juniors from future open club competition. The Dalys next moved to Zachary, Louisiana, where John completed ninth grade and half of the tenth grade.

John then attended Helias High School in Jefferson City, Missouri, the state capital, from the middle of his grade ten year, and was a junior golf member at the Jefferson City Country Club. He was a letterman there in football and golf. With John handling both punting and place-kicking duties, Helias football compiled a 10–0 record in 1983. In golf, John was a 1983 Missouri state team HS champion with Helias; he also holds several Helias school kicking records in football.

For his first significant golf success, Daly won the 1983 Missouri State Amateur Championship and then followed up by winning the 1984 Arkansas State Amateur Championship. Daly completed his final three months of high school at Dardanelle High School in spring 1984. Back at the Bay Ridge club that summer, Daly became friends with Rick Ross, who was a golf teaching professional there, and Ross assisted him with his golf game for the next several years.

College
Daly attended the University of Arkansas, from 1984 to 1987, on a golf scholarship, and was a member of the golf team. His golf team coaches were Steve Loy and Bill Woodley. Daly had tempestuous relationships with both due to his drinking problems and infrequent class attendance. Daly qualified for the 1986 U.S. Open, one of the four majors of male professional golf, as an amateur, and missed the 36-hole cut with scores of 88 and 76.

Professional golf career

1987–1989 
Daly left college without completing his degree and turned professional in summer 1987. His first pro victory came shortly afterwards, in the 1987 Missouri Open. From 1987 to 1989, Daly played mainly in minor events around the U.S., and had some encouraging success in South Africa in early 1989, where he challenged in several Sunshine Tour events. He also played in several PGA Tour events with some success, including finishing T-14 at the 1989 Chattanooga Classic, and making his first cut in a major, finishing T-69 at the 1989 U.S. Open.

1990: Ben Hogan Tour 
He earned full playing privileges on the Ben Hogan Tour (now the Korn Ferry Tour) for 1990, winning the qualifying tournament for the new circuit early that year. He then won two Sunshine Tour events early in 1990, one in South Africa (where he edged David Feherty), and one in Swaziland (where established veteran champion John Bland placed second). This was encouraging for Daly to win good-caliber events, defeat more experienced and well-established international professionals, and play before good-sized galleries which appreciated his performances.

He then won the 1990 Ben Hogan Utah Classic, and completed a fine year by finishing T-12 at the 1990 PGA Tour Qualifying Tournament, earning 1991 PGA Tour privileges on his fourth attempt.

1991 PGA Championship win
He joined the PGA Tour in 1991, showed increasingly strong play throughout the year, and then won the PGA Championship that August. This victory gained Daly a significant amount of media attention, due to the fact that Daly was the ninth and final alternate for the Championship. Just days before the tournament Nick Price dropped out, since his wife Sue was about to give birth. Daly, playing just his third major, was able to have Price's caddie Jeff (Squeaky) Medlin caddy for him. Daly had to drive through the night to arrive in time to claim his spot. A virtual unknown at the time, he achieved a first-round score of 69, even though he had not had time to play a practice round at the exceptionally difficult Crooked Stick Golf Club course near Indianapolis. He finished the tournament with scores of 69-67-69-71, giving him a three-stroke victory over veteran Bruce Lietzke, who was 15 years older. His feat generated enormous media coverage, propelling the hitherto virtually unknown Tour rookie to international fame. 
Late in the season, Daly became the first PGA Tour rookie to be invited to compete in the Skins Game, a made-for-television event featuring four top players, and he performed well there.
Daly was subsequently named PGA Tour Rookie of the Year for 1991. He was also the first rookie to win a major title since Jerry Pate won the U.S. Open in 1976.

His surprise victory and powerful swing provided the impetus for a cult-like fan base, composed of many people who had not been previously attracted to golf, and from that point onwards, Daly became one of the most popular players on Tour. He added to his reputation as a power hitter in 1993 by becoming, apparently, the first (and still the only) player to reach the green of the famous 630-yard hole 17 at Baltusrol Golf Club's Lower Course in two strokes.

1992: wins B.C. Open 
Daly had a good season in 1992, with several top 10 finishes: including finishing 5th place at The International, T-2 at the Kemper Open, and T-8 at the Buick Southern Open and the Nissan Los Angeles Open. At the 1992 PGA Championship, Daly struggled as the defending champion. He finished the tournament with rounds of 76-72-79-77 and ended up finishing in 82nd place. However, he recovered to win the B.C. Open by six strokes late in the season, for his second PGA Tour title.

1993: third at Masters 
Daly did not have a great season in 1993. He did however finish T-3 at the Masters Tournament and it became his only top-10 finish in a major championship outside his two wins. With no PGA Tour wins in 1993, Daly did manage to win the Alfred Dunhill Cup with Fred Couples and Payne Stewart. He had five top-25 finishes and one top-10 finish out of 15 cuts.

1994: suspended, wins BellSouth Classic 
In 1994, Daly experienced one of his most turbulent years. He was suspended by the PGA Tour from late 1993 into early 1994, due to behavior which included walking off the course mid-round during the 1993 late-season Kapalua International. The suspension also covered a mid-1993 incident at the Kemper Open, when he was upset after scoring a 77, threw his scorecard at the scoring tent, and was disqualified. The suspension covered another incident at the 1993 Southern Open where Daly walked off the course without telling his partners he was quitting. He entered alcohol rehab for three weeks in late 1993 and then returned to the Tour and won the 1994 BellSouth Classic, claiming it was his first win sober. This was his third PGA Tour title.

1995: Open Championship win
In 1995, in the midst of a middling season, Daly unexpectedly won The Open Championship in a playoff with Italy's Costantino Rocca at the Old Course, St Andrews. Daly had had prior excellent results on this course at the Dunhill Cup, and although he was listed at very long odds by bookies, some perceptive golf watchers, including David Feherty, believed before the event that the Old Course in fact suited Daly's game very well. Daly was in contention from the start of the event, but trailed New Zealand's Michael Campbell heading into a very windy final round. Campbell fell back in the difficult conditions, and Daly played a superb final round. As Rocca, in the last group, approached the final hole, he was one shot behind Daly, who had already finished his round. Rocca's long drive was only yards from the green, but his second shot resulted in a fluffed chip where he did not follow through. Rocca then sank a 60-foot (18 metre) putt to make the birdie he needed to force a playoff with Daly. Daly easily defeated Rocca in the playoff, finishing the four holes of the playoff at one under par, while Rocca finished three over par after hitting into the "Road Hole Bunker" on the 17th hole, and taking three shots to get out.

Daly is the only eligible two-time major winner never selected to play in the Ryder Cup.

1996–2000: struggles 
After winning the 1995 Open Championship, Daly struggled with his golf game and drinking habits for the next nine years. In 1996, Daly finished T-19 at The Players Championship and had a top-10 finish at the Kemper Open. At the 1996 U.S. Open, Daly finished T-27 with a final round 73, his best finish in the tournament. Daly's only win in 1996 was at the AT&T Australian Skins Game which was neither a PGA or European Tour event. In 1997, Daly started off the season by finishing 7th place at the Bob Hope Chrysler Classic. Afterwards, Daly's struggles at the time culminated into one of his worst seasons on the PGA Tour withdrawing from the U.S. Open after a first round 77 due to his physical condition and alcoholic shakes. It is reported that Daly was attending Alcoholics Anonymous meetings. Daly also withdrew from the 1997 Players Championship.

In 1998, Daly recorded one of the highest scores on a single hole in PGA Tour golf history, shooting an 18 on the sixth hole at the Bay Hill Invitational. Daly finished the 1998 season with two top-10 finishes including finishing T-16 at the Player's Championship with a final round 69, his best finish in the tournament. He also withdrew from the Sprint International and the Disney Classic and was disqualified from the FedEx St. Jude Classic.

In 1999, Daly won the JCPenney Classic, which was neither a PGA or European Tour event. Despite this, Daly did not have a good season in 1999 where he only had three top-25 finishes and withdrew from several tournaments. Daly also scored high rounds of 82 at the Memorial Tournament and 83 at the Player's Championship. At the 1999 U.S. Open, Daly finished 68th place after leading the tournament in the first round. After some struggles during the tournament, Daly said he would never play in the U.S. Open again, he later apologized for this. In 2000, Daly had a bad season only having one top-25 finish at the Honda Classic. He also withdrew from the U.S. Open after shooting an opening round 83.

2001: win in Germany 
In 2001, Daly won the BMW International Open with a one-stroke lead over Pádraig Harrington, with a personal best score of 27 under par for four rounds. This was the first time Daly had won a European Tour event in six years. After Daly had a comeback to the European Tour, he also had his best PGA Tour season since 1995. His best result was finishing 4th place at the Bell Canadian Open.

2002–2003: three wins away from major tours, two team wins 
In 2002, Daly was inducted into the Arkansas Golf Hall of Fame, and had two top-10 finishes on the PGA Tour which were 4th place finishes at the Buick Invitational and the Phoenix Open. Daly also made the cut at the 2002 Masters finishing T-32, the last time he would make the cut at the Masters. He also won the Champions Challenge that year, which was neither a PGA or European Tour event. In 2003, Daly did not have a good season, finishing T-7 at the Shell Houston Open, and winning two other tournaments that were neither PGA Tour or European Tour events. However, In both 2002 and 2003, Daly was a member of the winning PGA Tour team in the Wendy's 3-Tour Challenge event, competing against teams from the Champions Tour and the LPGA Tour.

2004: comeback 
Daly won the Buick Invitational in 2004, and he was also selected as PGA Tour Comeback Player of the Year for 2004. Daly won the tournament in a playoff against Luke Donald and Chris Riley. Daly started using Dunlop golf equipment before this tournament, and the Buick Invitational was his first victory in 189 PGA Tour events. Daly also increased his world golf ranking from 299th to a spot in the Top 50 during this time frame. He ranked 4th overall on the PGA tour for 2004.

2005–2006: two near-misses 
In 2005, Daly lost two playoffs in PGA Tour events to two of world golf's biggest stars. First, he was defeated by Vijay Singh's par on the first extra hole at the Houston Open. Then, he missed a two-foot putt on the second extra hole to lose to Tiger Woods at the WGC-American Express Championship in San Francisco.

Fans and golf columnists point to the 2005 WGC-American Express Championship as the event where John Daly's post-2006 exempt status would be determined. Tied with Tiger Woods at the end of regulation play, Daly missed a short par putt on the 2nd extra playoff hole, giving Woods the victory. Had Daly instead made the par, and then had gone on to win, he would have earned a three-year PGA Tour exemption through 2008. Daly also made it to another playoff in the 2005 Shell Houston Open, but lost on the first extra hole to Vijay Singh.

Daly's form declined in 2006, when he played in 21 events and made only 8 cuts as well as withdrawing from five events. Daly had only 1 Top-25 finish in 2006 at the WGC-Accenture Match Play Championship.

2007–2015: PGA Tour non-exempt status 
Daly entered the 2007 PGA Tour season without full exempt status for the first time since his 1991 PGA Championship victory, which carried a 10-year PGA Tour exemption. Another such exemption was earned with his 1995 Open Championship win. When Daly won the 2004 Buick Invitational, he earned a two-year exemption, which expired at the end of 2006. Daly finished 193rd on the 2006 PGA Tour Official Money List, thereby losing his full exempt status for 2007.

To upgrade his non-exempt status, Daly could have re-entered the PGA Tour qualifying process, but chose not to do this, relying upon sponsor exemptions to gain entry to PGA Tour events.

Daly was invited to play in the Honda Classic on March 1, 2007, on a sponsor's exemption, but had to withdraw after two holes. He pulled a muscle near his shoulder blade when he tried to stop his backswing after a fan snapped a picture. In December 2008, he was suspended for six months by the PGA Tour after an incident involving the Winston-Salem police.

After his 2008 suspension, Daly was forced to compete on the European Tour. After undergoing lap-band surgery to lose 40 pounds, he began playing much better golf, even managing to finish 2nd at the Italian Open. On May 26, 2009, Daly announced that he would return to the PGA Tour, via sponsor's exemption, for the St. Jude Classic. On July 17, Daly told The Dan Patrick Show that he had lost 80 pounds thanks to the surgery, dropping him to 205 lbs.

Daly did not win another professional tournament until December 2014, when he won the Beko Classic. The tournament, played at Gloria Golf Club in Belek, Antalya, Turkey, is sanctioned by the PGA of Europe.

Daly's last top finish on an elite tour came at the 2009 Italian Open. There he finished in a distant tie for second to Daniel Vancsik of Argentina. It punctuated how unusual Daly's history of results had been. He recorded almost as many top finishes internationally as he did at PGA Tour events in the United States. He won two events on the South African Tour early in his career: the AECI Charity Classic and the Hollard Royal Swazi Sun Classic in 1990, an event where he had finished runner-up in 1989. Later in his career, in addition to famously winning the 1995 Open Championship in Scotland, he performed very well in regular European Tour events. He won the 2001 BMW International Open and finished runner-up at the 1994 Irish Open, 2001 German Masters, 2005 BMW International Open, and the aforementioned 2009 Italian Open. His four runner-up finishes in Europe match the amount of runner-up finishes he had at American events on the PGA Tour. He also won the 2003 Korea Open, the most prestigious event on the Korean Tour.

Although Daly had $10,270,681 in career earnings as of February 20, 2023, he is not among the top 50 on the PGA Tour's All-Time Career Money List, and so he must now depend heavily on sponsor invitations (PGA Tour Exemption Category 11).

As far as individual tournaments are concerned, Daly is exempt for life in the PGA Championship and AT&T Pebble Beach National Pro-Am, and up to age 60 in the Open Championship. In order to play in the Masters, U.S. Open, a World Golf Championship or a FedEx Cup Playoff Event, Daly would have to satisfy the particular invitational requirements of such events. Daly has not played at the Masters since 2006, and he has not made the cut there since 2002.

However, after shooting a then personal-high 88 at the Buick Open in late July 2009, he claimed to be losing confidence in his game, and his swing coach blamed the surgery for making him lose muscle along with weight, taking power away from his swing. However, Daly blamed the effects of his poor eyesight on his putting for his high golf score.

On March 14, 2014, during the second round of the Valspar Championship, Daly shot a career worst 90 which included an 8-over-par 12 on the 16th hole. His frequent failure to make cuts and high rounds have revived debates on players who frequently receive sponsor exemptions.

Daly shot a score of 68 for the first round of the 2012 PGA Championship which was played at Kiawah Island, South Carolina. Daly finished 18th place in that tournament, which was the first time Daly had finished in the top 20 in a major championship since the Open in 2005. 

Daly continued to play more abroad vs. United States due to his limited status on the PGA Tour. In the late fall of 2014 Daly started to show some promise finishing T-29 at the Sanderson Farms Championship, and then quietly finishing T-10 at the Puerto Rico Open, his first top-10 finish in three years. Soon after, Daly finished T-25 at the Turkish Airlines Open, a European Tour event with a strong field. Daly won the Beko Classic on December 6, 2014, an event sanctioned by the PGAs of Europe, finishing at −15. It was Daly's first win in over 10 years. At the end of 2015, Daly tried to get back his European Tour card in Shanghai. He finished T-46 at the BMW Masters and T-50 at the Turkish Airlines Open failing to get back his card.

2016–present: PGA Tour Champions 
Having turned 50 on April 28, 2016, Daly became eligible to play on the PGA Tour Champions. His debut was at the Insperity Invitational in May, where he finished tied for 17th. 

On May 7, 2017, Daly won the Insperity Invitational on the PGA Tour Champions after shooting a 14-under par for the tournament. It was his first win of a PGA Tour-affiliated event since 2004, and it happened exactly one year after he made his PGA Tour Champions debut. Daly continues to compete semi-regularly on the tour.

Golf swing
Daly has a flowing self-taught golf swing which was built for raw power and distance. Daly takes his golf club back much farther past parallel on his back swing by extreme coiling of his arms and shoulders which creates very fast club head speed on his down swing. However, Daly's golf swing has contributed to his inconsistent performance during golf tournaments since almost perfect timing is required for proper execution of such a powerful golf swing.

Incidents during golf tournaments
Daly has had several incidents during golf tournaments which have contributed to his "Wild Thing" image including the following:
 During the 1993 Kapalua International, Daly was disqualified for picking up his ball after a missed birdie putt before finishing the eleventh hole and putting the ball in his pocket. He was then suspended by the PGA Tour.
During the 1994 PGA Tour's NEC World Series of Golf, Daly hit several shots into the group playing in front of him on the 14th hole in the final round. Daly drove the green twice and one of those shots almost hit professional golfer Jeff Roth. This led to a scuffle between Daly and Jeff Roth's father. They wrestled to the ground and the altercation was broken up by fans.
During the 1998 PGA Tour's Bay Hill Invitational, Daly used a three-wood to hit six golf balls into the water during the final round. Daly finally got his seventh attempt over the water which was a distance of approximately 270 yards. Daly shot an 18 on the par-five sixth hole and finished the round with a score of 85.
During the 1998 PGA Tour's FedEx St. Jude Classic, Daly hit a 5-iron shot out of bounds on the par-4 17th hole, took a drop, and hit his ball with the same club again out of bounds. Daly then proceeded to break his club. He finished with a score of 74, walked off the course, and was disqualified for not signing his scorecard.
During the 1999 U.S. Open, Daly took a two-stroke penalty for hitting his ball while it was moving on the par-4 eighth hole. He carded an 11 on the eighth hole, shot a final round score of 83, and finished 68th place. Daly said he took the penalty in protest against the USGA for placing too many unfair pins on Pinehurst No. 2's mounded greens.
 In the 2000 U.S. Open, he shot a 14 on the par-five 18th hole and withdrew after an opening-round 83. Daly hit three golf balls into the Pacific Ocean and hit another into a backyard next to the fairway.
 At the 2002 Australian PGA Championship, after making a triple-bogey seven on his last hole at the Coolum course in Australia, Daly threw his putter and ball into a pond and later failed to sign for a 78 on his scorecard, disqualifying himself from the tournament. Daly was later fined by the Australian Tour and was ordered to write a letter of apology to a tour official he verbally abused.
 During the 2008 Australian Open, he broke a spectator's camera at Royal Sydney's ninth hole. He was given a suspended fine by Golf Australia.
 Daly walked off during his first round at the 2011 Australian Open after hitting all of his golf balls into the water. Daly's problems started on the 10th hole when he received an automatic two-stroke penalty for hitting the wrong ball in the bunker. On the 11th hole, he hit seven golf balls in the water before leaving the tournament.
 In the second round of the 2015 PGA Championship at the Whistling Straits Golf Course in Haven, Wisconsin, Daly, who was at the time 1-over par right at the cut line, hit three consecutive tee shot attempts into the water of Lake Michigan at the par-3 7th hole. He used a 4-iron on the first unsuccessful try, then switched to a 6-iron on the next two failed tries. After his fourth attempt (his 7th shot), which found the green, Daly was so livid about his shot selection that he threw his 6-iron into Lake Michigan. Daly ended up scoring a septuple-bogey 10, dropping to +8. He finished the round with an 82 and missed the cut.

Charity works
After winning the PGA Championship at Crooked Stick Golf Club in 1991, Daly gave $30,000 to the family of a man who died during the tournament due to lightning strike. The money was used by the family to pay college expenses for the man's two daughters. Daly was just starting his golf career and was not wealthy at the time.

Daly is known for his involvement in many charities including several in northwest Arkansas. He has donated money to his high school, the Make-A-Wish Foundation, and Boys and Girls Clubs of America. Daly is also an active supporter of the sports programs at the University of Arkansas. He shaved his signature "mullet", and donated the proceeds from the event to various charities. Daly regularly plays in the celebrity Pro-Am Monday after the Masters hosted by his friends, Hootie & the Blowfish.

Businesses
Daly is in partnership with Loudmouth Golf line of clothing, which includes licensing deals with the NFL's Dallas Cowboys and Arkansas Razorbacks. Sales continue to increase making it difficult to meet demand. In October 2014, Daly signed an endorsement deal with Rock Bottom Golf, a discount golf retailer. In 2006, Daly launched a wine label John Daly Wines, now defunct.

Daly also has a company which designs golf courses (JD Designs), including Sevillano Links at Rolling Hills Casino in Corning, California. Sevillano Links is one of the few links style golf courses in the Western United States, and named "Best New Golf Course" by Golfweek magazine. Other golf courses that John Daly helped design include:
 Wicked Stick Golf Links, Myrtle Beach, South Carolina (closed)
 Blarney Golf Resort, County Cork, Ireland
 Thundering Waters Golf Club, Niagara Falls, Ontario, Canada
 Murder Rock Golf Club, Branson, Missouri
 The Lion's Den, Dardanelle, Arkansas

Prostroke Golf for the Xbox 360, PS3, and PC. In the game, John Daly is the instructor, as well as the opponent, for players. The game includes twelve courses modeled after real-world courses, but these are locked at the outset. In order to unlock courses, players must defeat Daly in Challenges, including driving, short game, and putting. Unlocking a course allows the player to play against Daly and other players in tournaments.

Music career
In 2007, Daly provided back-up vocals in the Kid Rock song, "Half Your Age". In April 2010, Daly released his second music album called I Only Know One Way on Long Ball Records/Hopesong Digital/GMV Nashville. He wrote and co-wrote eight tracks on the album. One track includes Hootie And The Blowfish's lead singer Darius Rucker and a cover of Bob Dylan's "Knockin' On Heaven's Door". John said about his perspective on his music: "The album itself is really my life. All of the songs have a meaning. Most of the record is happening or has happened in my life. I hope people can relate to some of the troubles I have had along the way. Everyone around the world has problems, and I want to connect with those people." Daly's first album, My Life, included guest vocals by Darius, Willie Nelson and Johnny Lee.

Studio albums

Singles

Other appearances

Personal life

Alcohol
In March 2008, Daly's swing coach Butch Harmon quit, saying that "the most important thing in (Daly's) life is getting drunk." Daly responded by saying, "I think his lies kind of destroyed my life for a little bit."

On October 26, 2008, Daly was taken into protective custody by Winston-Salem police after being found drunk outside a Hooters restaurant. Daly was not arrested or charged with a violation. However, the police released his mug shot to the media which resulted in negative publicity. Shortly after this incident, Daly committed to stop drinking alcohol, which resulted in a progressive resurgence of his game and a positive change in his personal life; this was confirmed by Daly himself at the Open on July 15, 2010.

In an interview on the Dan Patrick Show on August 6, 2014, Daly said that much of his past struggle with alcohol was due to growing up with an alcoholic and abusive father.

Health
In July 1994, Daly claimed that many PGA golfers were cocaine users, and said that if drug testing was done properly on tour, he would be "one of the cleanest guys out there". This statement brought an uproar among the pro golf community.

In early 2009 he had lap-band surgery which limits the amount of food that he can consume. As of December 8, 2009, Daly had shed well over 100 pounds and was "a slim, trim 185".

In July 2019, Daly had a near-death experience after being bitten by a brown recluse spider while he was vacationing in England. He had developed sepsis and required an emergency surgery.

In September 2020, Daly announced he had recently battled with bladder cancer. He underwent surgery to remove the cancer, but doctors said there was an 85 percent chance of relapse. To reduce the chance of recurrence, Daly plans to improve his previously unhealthy lifestyle which involved smoking and drinking large amounts of Diet Coke.

Gambling
In 2006, Daly revealed in the last chapter of his autobiography that he has had great difficulty with a gambling problem. He claims to have lost between US$50 and $60 million over a 15-year period. This includes losing $1.5 million in October 2005, after winning half that amount at the WGC-American Express tournament, most of it lost on a $5,000 Las Vegas slot machine at Wynn Casino.

Marriages 
Daly married Dale Crafton in 1987. They divorced in 1990.

In summer 1992, he married his second wife, Bettye Fulford. They had a daughter, Shynah Hale. In December 1992, Daly was charged with third-degree assault for throwing Bettye into a wall at their home near Denver. The actual circumstances of the incident remained unclear so far as public releases were concerned, since Bettye did not wish to pursue the matter. Daly has said in his autobiography that he did not, nor has he ever, hit or hurt a woman.

After Daly's divorce with Fulford was finalized in 1995, he married Paulette Dean that same year. A daughter, Sierra Lynn, was born on June 1, 1995. The couple divorced in 1999.

On July 29, 2001, he married Sherrie Miller. Their son John Patrick Daly II was born July 23, 2003. On June 8, 2007, Daly and Sherrie got into a fight at a restaurant in Memphis, Tennessee, site of that week's tour stop, the Stanford St. Jude Championship. Daly claims that later that night his wife attacked him with a steak knife. He showed up for his second round on Friday afternoon with cuts and scrapes across his face. Authorities were contacted by him and came to his house, but his wife had already fled the scene and taken their son with her.

Sherrie (at some point) pleaded guilty to federal drug charges and was sentenced to a five-month prison term. On December 17, 2010, in Memphis, Circuit Court Judge Donna Fields awarded custody of the couple's seven-year-old son "Little John" to Daly, and jailed Sherrie for interfering with Daly's court-ordered visitation rights and other failures to abide by the court's orders in their ongoing divorce proceeding, saying "She is not following this court's orders. That is criminal contempt."

Lawsuits
In 2005, Daly sued the Florida Times-Union for libel after a columnist claimed Daly "failed the scoundrel sniff test." A judge threw out the case in 2009, saying that Daly had failed to prove the basis of the libel claim: namely, that the statements were untrue. Daly was also ordered by a judge to pay the newspaper over $300,000 in legal fees.

Politics
Daly is a Republican and vocal supporter of Donald Trump.

Daly has advocated for the legalization of cannabis in Arkansas, endorsing a ballot measure in 2022 that he said would create "millions in new funding for our police, ... thousands of good jobs, [and] revenue for our state".

Video games 
Daly became the first of two real people to make an appearance in the Everybody's Golf series, appearing in the third installment, Hot Shots Golf 3; the other is Shigeki Maruyama who appeared in Everybody's Golf 5.

He also appears in the popular arcade golf game Golden Tee.

He appeared in the Tiger Woods PGA Tour video game series from 2004 to 2009.

High school and amateur wins
 1979 Spring Club Championship, Lake of the Woods Club, Fredericksburg, Virginia
 1983 Missouri State HS Team Championship, 1A-3A division, with Helias High School, Jefferson City
 1983 Missouri State Amateur Championship
 1984 Arkansas State Amateur Championship

Professional wins (19)

PGA Tour wins (5)

PGA Tour playoff record (2–2)

European Tour wins (3)

European Tour playoff record (1–1)

Asian Tour wins (1)

1Co-sanctioned by the Korean Tour

Sunshine Tour wins (2)

Ben Hogan Tour wins (1)

Ben Hogan Tour playoff record (0–1)

Other wins (8)

Other playoff record (1–0)

PGA Tour Champions wins (1)

Major championships

Wins (2)

1Defeated Rocca in four-hole playoff; Daly (4-3-4-4=15), Rocca (5-4-7-3=19).

Results timeline
Results not in chronological order in 2020.

CUT = missed the half way cut
WD = withdrew
"T" indicates a tie for a place
NT = No tournament due to COVID-19 pandemic

Summary

 Most consecutive cuts made – 7 (1992 Open Championship – 1994 Masters)
 Longest streak of top-10s – 1 (three times)

Results in The Players Championship

CUT = missed the halfway cut
WD = withdrew
"T" indicates a tie for a place

Results in World Golf Championships

QF, R16, R32, R64 = Round in which player lost in match play
"T" = Tied

Results in senior major championships

"T" indicates a tie for a place
CUT = missed the halfway cut
DQ = disqualified
WD = withdrew
NT = No tournament due to COVID-19 pandemic

U.S. national team appearances
 Alfred Dunhill Cup: 1993 (winners), 1998, 2000
 World Cup: 1998
Wendy's 3-Tour Challenge (representing PGA Tour): 1995, 2001, 2002 (winners), 2003 (winners), 2004, 2005

See also
1990 PGA Tour Qualifying School graduates
Monday Night Golf

References

External links

John Daly book excerpt (official publisher web page)

American male golfers
Arkansas Razorbacks men's golfers
PGA Tour golfers
Winners of men's major golf championships
Golfers from California
Golfers from Arkansas
Golfers from Missouri
People from Carmichael, California
People from Dardanelle, Arkansas
People from Germantown, Tennessee
Sportspeople from Jefferson City, Missouri
1966 births
Living people